Mimacronia alboplagiata is a species of beetle in the family Cerambycidae. It was described by Schultze in 1922, originally under the genus Acronia. It is known from Philippines.

References

Pteropliini
Beetles described in 1922